Leslie Dennis Berry (born 4 May 1956) is an English former professional footballer. He played for Charlton Athletic, Brighton & Hove Albion, Gillingham and Maidstone United between 1972 and 1991, making over 450 appearances in the Football League.

References

1956 births
Footballers from Plumstead
Living people
Association football defenders
English footballers
Maidstone United F.C. (1897) players
Gillingham F.C. players
Charlton Athletic F.C. players
Brighton & Hove Albion F.C. players
Margate F.C. players
Welling United F.C. players
English Football League players